Sylvia may refer to:

People
Sylvia (given name)
Sylvia (singer), American country music and country pop singer and songwriter
Sylvia Robinson, American singer, record producer, and record label executive
Sylvia Vrethammar, Swedish singer credited as "Sylvia" in Australia and the UK
 Tim Sylvia, American mixed martial arts fighter
 Colin Sylvia, Australian football player

Places
Mount Sylvia, a former name of Xueshan on Taiwan Island
Mount Sylvia, Queensland, Australia
Sylvia, Kansas, a town in Kansas, United States
Sylvia's Restaurant of Harlem, New York City, New York, United States

Art, entertainment, and media

Comics
Sylvia (comic strip), a long-running comic strip by cartoonist Nicole Hollander

Films
Sylvia (1961 film), an Australian television play
Sylvia (1965 film), an American drama film
Sylvia (1985 film), a New Zealand film about New Zealand educator Sylvia Ashton-Warner,
Sylvia (2003 film), a British biographical drama film about the romance between prominent poets Sylvia Plath and Ted Hughes

Literature
Sylvia is a character in The Wolves of Willoughby Chase. The book was published in 1962.
Sylvia (1913 novel), a novel published as the work of Upton Sinclair, written by his wife Mary Craig Kimbrough Sinclair
Sylvia (novel), a 2006 historical novel by Bryce Courtenay
Sylvia (play), a play by A.R. Gurney

Music
An Sylvia, an 1826 work by Franz Schubert
"Sylvia", a 1914 love song by Oley Speaks, sung by Paul Robeson
"Sylvia" (Focus song), a single from the 1972 Focus album Focus III
"Sylvia", a single from the 2009 album Hospice by The Antlers
 "Sylvia's Mother", 1972 single by Dr. Hook & the Medicine Show
"Sylvia" (Elvis Presley song), a song by Elvis Presley from the 1972 album Elvis Now

Stage performances
Sylvia (ballet) or Sylvia ou La Nymphe de Diane, a classical ballet with music written by Léo Delibes in 1876
Sylvia (musical), a musical on the life of Sylvia Pankhurst, premiered at the Old Vic in September 2018

Video games
Sylvia Christel, a character in the No More Heroes series

Science
Sylvia (bird), a genus of birds containing the "typical warblers"
87 Sylvia, an asteroid

Sports
IF Sylvia, a Swedish football club

Ships
, the name of more than one United States Navy ship

See also
 "Who is Sylvia?", a song in Shakespeare's play The Two Gentlemen of Verona
 Nissan Silvia
 Silvia (disambiguation)
 Sylvie (disambiguation)
 Sylwia (disambiguation)
 

hu:Szilvia